Jeff Davis County is the name of two counties in the United States:

 Jeff Davis County, Georgia 
 Jeff Davis County, Texas

See also 
Jefferson Davis County, Mississippi 
Jefferson Davis Parish, Louisiana